Globorotalia is a genus of foraminifers belonging to the family Globorotaliidae.
It is a single-celled animal large enough to be seen with a naked eye and is found in the fossil record back to the Paleocene. It is deep-dwelling planktonic foraminifers that inhabit the top few hundred meters of the ocean and constitute potential recorders of thermocline conditions.
The genus has cosmopolitan distribution.

Species

Species:

Globorotalia adamantea 
Globorotalia akersi 
Globorotalia alamedillensis

References

Foraminifera